Hélcio da Silva (born 28 June 1928) is a Brazilian athlete. He competed in the men's pole vault at the 1952 Summer Olympics.

References

1928 births
Living people
Athletes (track and field) at the 1952 Summer Olympics
Brazilian male pole vaulters
Olympic athletes of Brazil
Place of birth missing (living people)
20th-century Brazilian people